The list of ship launches in 1725 includes a chronological list of some ships launched in 1725.


References

1725
Ship launches